is a Japanese football player for V-Varen Nagasaki.

Career
Masuyama joined J1 League club Vissel Kobe in 2015.

Club statistics
Updated to 19 February 2019.

References

External links

Profile at Vissel Kobe

1997 births
Living people
Association football people from Fukuoka Prefecture
Japanese footballers
J1 League players
J2 League players
Vissel Kobe players
Yokohama FC players
Avispa Fukuoka players
Oita Trinita players
V-Varen Nagasaki players
Association football midfielders
Japanese people of Filipino descent
People from Fukuoka